Etlingera versteegii is a monocotyledonous plant species that was first described by Theodoric Valeton, and given its current name from Rosemary Margaret Smith. Etlingera versteegii is part of the genus Etlingera and the family Zingiberaceae. No subspecies are listed in the Catalog of Life.

References 

versteegii
Taxa named by Rosemary Margaret Smith